Charles Edward Culberson (born April 10, 1989) is an American professional baseball infielder in the Tampa Bay Rays organization. The San Francisco Giants drafted Culberson in the first round in the 2007 Major League Baseball draft. He previously played in Major League Baseball (MLB) for the San Francisco Giants, Colorado Rockies, Los Angeles Dodgers, Atlanta Braves and Texas Rangers. He made his MLB debut in 2012.

Personal life

Culberson was born in Rome, Georgia, to parents Charles and Kim. He has an elder sister, Chelce. Culberson's father was the Giants 16th pick in the 1984 draft, and played in their minor league system for five seasons.  While some baseball sites state that Leon Culberson, who played in the major leagues from 1943 to 1948, was Charlie Culberson's grandfather, Charlie Culberson has stated that "he was actually my grandfather’s first cousin."

Culberson grew up a Braves fan. He attended Calhoun High School in Calhoun, Georgia. In 2005, Culberson's high school baseball team won the state championship. On August 15, 2015, he was inducted into the Calhoun-Gordon County Sports Hall of Fame.

Culberson married Sarah O'Rourke in November 2011. The couple have three children.

Professional career

San Francisco Giants
The San Francisco Giants drafted Culberson in the first round of the Supplemental Draft (51st overall) of the 2007 Major League Baseball Draft out of Calhoun High School in Calhoun, Georgia. They added him to the 40 man roster to protect him from the Rule 5 draft after the 2011 season, in which he batted .259 with 10 home runs and 56 runs batted in for the Richmond Flying Squirrels of the Double-A Eastern League. He was rated the seventh best second base prospect prior to the 2012 season.

After beginning the 2012 season with the Fresno Grizzlies of the Class AAA Pacific Coast League, the Giants promoted Culberson to the big league club on May 13, 2012. He made his MLB debut that day and collected his first major league base hit against Arizona Diamondbacks starter Joe Saunders.

Colorado Rockies 
On July 27, 2012, Culberson was traded to the Colorado Rockies for Marco Scutaro and cash considerations. He spent the rest of the 2012 season with the Colorado Springs Sky Sox, the Rockies' AAA affiliate, and continued to play for them in 2013. In 97 games for the Sky Sox, he hit .310/.338/.524 with 14 home runs, 64 RBI and 8 triples.

On July 29, Culberson was recalled by the Rockies, replacing Jordan Pacheco. When Carlos González went on the disabled list, Culberson and Corey Dickerson entered a platoon situation in left field. On August 16, 2013, Culberson hit his first MLB home run off Wei-Yin Chen of the Baltimore Orioles. In 47 games with the Rockies, he hit .293/.317/.404 with 2 home runs, 12 RBI and 5 stolen bases.

On May 4, 2014, Culberson hit a pinch-hit walk-off two-run home run off New York Mets closer Kyle Farnsworth, giving the Rockies an 11–10 victory.

During spring training in 2015, Culberson was injured. Nearer to opening day, he was diagnosed with a herniated disc in his back, and played in only five games at the major league level.  After the season, he was granted free agency by the Rockies and signed a minor league contract with the Los Angeles Dodgers.

Los Angeles Dodgers
Culberson was signed by the Dodgers in November 2015 and invited to spring training, where he impressed new Dodgers manager Dave Roberts. After an injury to Howie Kendrick opened a spot for him, Culberson made the Dodgers 2016 Opening Day roster. He was designated for assignment in July and optioned to the Oklahoma City Dodgers, then recalled a month later. Culberson ended the big club's final home game of the season with a walk-off home run against former Rockies teammate Boone Logan, clinching the Dodgers' fourth consecutive National League West division title. It was also the last Dodgers home game called by longtime broadcaster Vin Scully. He played in 34 games for Los Angeles, hitting .284 and in 70 games for Oklahoma City, hitting .260. He had no hits in seven at-bats with two strikeouts in the 2016 National League Division Series. He was outrighted to the minors and removed from the 40-man roster on December 9, 2016. He was assigned to Oklahoma City to begin the season. He remained in the minors for the conclusion of the AAA season, hitting .250 in 108 games and returned to the majors with the Dodgers on September 4. In 15 games for the Dodgers, he hit .154 with two hits in 13 at-bats. When starting shortstop Corey Seager was left off of the 2017 NLCS roster because of a back injury, Culberson was added to the postseason roster. He appeared in all five games of the series, with five hits in 11 at-bats for a .455 average. In the 2017 World Series, Culberson had three hits in five at-bats, including his first career post-season home run, which he hit off Chris Devenski of the Houston Astros in the 11th inning of Game Two.

Atlanta Braves
On December 16, 2017, the Dodgers traded Culberson, Adrián González, Scott Kazmir, Brandon McCarthy, and cash considerations to the Atlanta Braves for Matt Kemp. Culberson struggled to begin the 2018 season, earning a larger role in late May due to an injury to Ronald Acuña Jr. On May 28, Culberson hit a walk-off home run against the New York Mets as a pinch hitter. He repeated this feat on June 3 against the Washington Nationals. Culberson pitched professionally for the first time on August 17, taking the mound in the ninth inning of a game against the Colorado Rockies. His success during the 2018 season earned him the nickname "Charlie Clutch."

Culberson and the Braves agreed to a one-year contract worth $1.395 million for the 2019 season. He changed uniform numbers from 16 to 8 to accommodate the return of Brian McCann to the organization as a free agent. On September 14, Culberson was struck by a pitched ball thrown by Fernando Rodney of the Washington Nationals, and left the game. Culberson suffered several facial fractures. In 2019, he batted .259/.294/.437 with five home runs and 20 RBIs.

Culberson was non-tendered and became a free agent on December 2, 2019. He returned to the Braves by signing a minor league contract on December 13. On July 21, 2020, Culberson had his contract selected to the 40-man roster. On September 8, Culberson was designated for assignment by the Braves.

In 2020, he batted one-for-seven with an RBI.

On September 30, 2020, Culberson was selected back to the 40-man roster to be active for the Wild Card Series matchup against the Cincinnati Reds

Texas Rangers
On December 28, 2020, Culberson signed a minor league deal with the Texas Rangers and was invited to spring training. On March 29, 2021, Culberson was selected to the 40-man roster. Over 90 games in 2021, Culberson hit .243/.296/.381/.676 with 5 home runs, 22 RBI, with 7 stolen bases. On March 17, 2022, Culberson signed a minor league contract with Texas. On April 5, 2022, Culberson had his contract selected to the major league roster. Getting into 68 games for Texas in 2022, Culberson hit .252/.283/.357/.640 with 2 home runs and 12 RBI that season.

Tampa Bay Rays
On February 9, 2023, Culberson signed a minor league contract with the Tampa Bay Rays organization.

References

External links

1989 births
Living people
Sportspeople from Rome, Georgia
People from Calhoun, Georgia
Baseball players from Georgia (U.S. state)
Major League Baseball second basemen
San Francisco Giants players
Colorado Rockies players
Los Angeles Dodgers players
Atlanta Braves players
Texas Rangers players
Arizona League Giants players
Augusta GreenJackets players
San Jose Giants players
Scottsdale Scorpions players
Richmond Flying Squirrels players
Fresno Grizzlies players
Colorado Springs Sky Sox players
Toros del Este players
American expatriate baseball players in the Dominican Republic
Albuquerque Isotopes players
Oklahoma City Dodgers players
Calhoun High School alumni